Victoriaborg is a neighbourhood of Accra, the capital of Ghana. Formed in the late nineteenth century as an exclusive European residential neighborhood,  Victoriaborg was located to the east of Accra's city limits of the time, behind cliffs where there was reported to "always be a breeze".  With its luxurious homes, race course, golf course, polo and cricket field, tennis courts, and racially segregated hospital, "Victoriaborg was like a piece of England grafted into the townscape of Accra."

As the city expanded, the suburban neighborhood of Victoriaborg was incorporated into the urban area.  Following the independence of Ghana, the European CBD in Victoriaborg was de-Europeanized.  The area was nationalized in a symbolic sense with the siting of the Bank of Ghana, Ministries, Independence Square, and the headquarters of newly established national companies in the district.  

Today, architecture in Victoriaborg ranges from elegant Georgian colonial buildings to glittering modern tower blocks reflecting its transition from a Victorian residential suburb to the modern business district it is today.

Landmarks/Places of interest
Supreme Court of Ghana
Kwame Nkrumah Memorial Park
Holy Trinity Cathedral
Makola Shopping Mall
National Hockey Pitch
Independence Square
Ohene Djan Stadium
Bank of Ghana national headquarters
State House

References

Accra